Baddie or baddy may refer to:
 An informal term for badminton
 An informal term for a villain or antagonist
 A bad or subpar video game player, or noob
 Baddiewinkle, Helen Ruth Elam, (born 1928), an American internet personality
 detroitbaddie, (born 2002), an American internet personality